Earn to Die 2 is a game developed by Russian indie studio Toffee Games, which is the sequel to 2013's Earn to Die 1. Earn to Die 2 sees a departure from the familiar desert setting of the original game, and delves into the depths of cities overrun by zombies. Players have to get through the city in order to reach checkpoints and the finish to win the game level.

Reception

Critical reception for Earn to Die 2 has been mixed and the game holds a rating of 63/100 on Metacritic, signifying "mixed or average reviews". TouchArcade rated the game favorably and wrote "With the advance we've seen from E2D 1 to E2D 2, I think the future looks pretty bright for this game franchise, and there are some areas they could pretty smoothly transition into." Pocket Gamer was more critical of the game, describing the gameplay as being a "grind-fest."

References

External links

2014 video games
Action video games
Android (operating system) games
Indie video games
IOS games
Single-player video games
Video games developed in Russia
Video games about zombies
Video game sequels

Windows games